Girdhar Kumar Pandey (born 15 February 1972) is an Indian molecular biologist, biochemist, biotechnologist, and a professor at the department of plant molecular biology of the South Campus of the University of Delhi. He is known for his studies on the signal transduction pathways in Arabidopsis  (rockcress) and Oryza sativa (rice) and is an elected fellow of the National Academy of Sciences, India and the National Academy of Agricultural Sciences. The Department of Biotechnology of the Government of India awarded him the National Bioscience Award for Career Development, one of the highest Indian science awards, for his contributions to biosciences, in 2015.

Biography 

Girdhar Pandey was born on 15 February 1972 at Almora, in Uttarakhand to Kishan Chand and Kamala Devi Pandey. He completed his graduate studies in biochemistry from the University of Delhi in 1992 and moved to Banaras Hindu University for his post-graduate studies.  After securing a master's degree in biotechnology in 1994, he returned to Delhi to pursue for his doctoral research under the guidance of Sudhir Kumar Sopory which earned him a PhD in 1999 from Jawaharlal Nehru University for his thesis, Presence and role of homologues of E. histolytica Calcium binding protein in higher plants and characterization of a novel protein kinase from Brassica juncea. His post-doctoral work was at the University of California, Berkeley under the supervision of Sheng Luan during 2000–07.

Pandey returned to India the same year to start his career by joining the University of Delhi at its south campus as a reader at the department of molecular biology and became a full professor in 2014. In between, he served as an associate professor from 2011 to 2014. He also served as a visiting professor at Capital Normal University, Beijing in 2012 and at the Institute of AgriBiotechnology of Jiangsu Academy of Agricultural Sciences in 2015.

Pandey is married to Amita Pandey (née Tyagi) who is a member of faculty of the University of Delhi and a co-author of some of his books. The family resides at Dwarka, Delhi.

Professional profile 
Pandey's research focuses on the mechanistic interplay of signal transduction networks in plants under mineral nutrient deficiency and abiotic stresses. The team has identified Arabidopsis (rockcress) and Oryza (rice) as the main focus of study. His studies have been documented by way of a number of articles and ResearchGate, an online repository of scientific articles has listed 148 of them. Besides, he has published 7 books, including The UNC-53-mediated Interactome: Analysis of its Role in the Generation of the C. elegans Connectome, GTPases: Versatile Regulators of Signal Transduction in Plants, Global Comparative Analysis of CBL-CIPK Gene Families in Plants, and Mechanism of Plant Hormone Signaling Under Stress - A Functional Genomic Frontier, a two-volume book published by Wiley-Blackwell in 2016 and has contributed chapters to books published by self and others. He is an academic editor of PLOS One and an editor of Physiology and Molecular Biology of Plants. He sits in the editorial boards of journals such as Plant Signaling and Behaviour,  Journal of Biological Sciences, Scientific Reports, Current Biotechnology, Current Genomics, and is an associate editor of Plant Molecular Biology Reporter and a former associate editor of Frontiers in Plant Science.

Awards and honors 
Pandey received the Far Eastern Regional Research Organization (FERRO) Award of the United States Department of Agriculture in 1998 and the DBT-CREST Award of the Department of Biotechnology in 2011. The Department of Biotechnology (DBT) of the Government of India awarded him the National Bioscience Award for Career Development, one of the highest Indian science awards in 2015. The National Academy of Sciences, India elected him as a fellow in 2016 and he became an elected fellow of the National Academy of Agricultural Sciences in 2018.
In 2018, Indian Society for Plant Physiology, New Delhi has awarded him with J.J. Chinoy Gold Medal award.

Selected bibliography

Books

Chapters 
 </ref>

Articles

See also 

 Protein kinase
 Genome

Notes

References

External links 
 

N-BIOS Prize recipients
Indian scientific authors
Living people
Scientists from Uttarakhand
People from Almora
Indian molecular biologists
Indian biochemists
Indian biotechnologists
Delhi University alumni
Banaras Hindu University alumni
Jawaharlal Nehru University alumni
University of California, Berkeley alumni
Academic staff of Delhi University
1972 births